North Tapanuli Regency (Tapanuli Utara - in Indonesian, "utara" means "north") is a landlocked regency in North Sumatra province, Sumatra, Indonesia. Its capital is Tarutung. The regency covers an area of 3,793.71 square kilometres and it had a population of 278,897 at the 2010 Census and 312,758 at the 2020 Census.

Administrative districts
The regency is divided into fifteen districts (kecamatan), tabulated below with their areas and their populations at the 2010 Census and the 2020 Census. The table also includes the location of the district administrative centres, the number of administrative villages (totalling 241 rural desa and 11 urban kelurahan) in each district and its post code.

Note: (a) including 7 of the urban kelurahan of the district's 11 kelurahan.

Soda Pond

Soda Pond, or Aek Rara is located at the bottom of Parbubu I Hill village. The pond's natural spring water generates bubbles and a soda aroma can be smelled. It is safe for swimming, but the use of googles is recommended. The locals regularly use the water from the pond to water nearby rice paddy fields.

References

Batak